Kang Jianmin (1916–1977) original name Kang Tingwen, other name Kang Tianmin, was a People's Liberation Army major general and People's Republic of China politician. He was born in Yuzhong County, Gansu Province. He was Communist Party of China Committee Secretary and Chairman of Ningxia.

1916 births
1977 deaths
People's Republic of China politicians from Gansu
Chinese Communist Party politicians from Gansu
People's Liberation Army generals from Gansu
Political office-holders in Ningxia
Alternate members of the 9th Central Committee of the Chinese Communist Party